Pikmin may refer to:

The Pikmin series of video games
Pikmin, the first video game in the Pikmin series, released in 2001 for the Nintendo GameCube
Pikmin 2, the second video game, released in 2004 for the GameCube
New Play Control! Pikmin, a 2008 Wii port of the GameCube games
Pikmin 3, the third video game, released in 2013 for the Wii U
Pikmin 3 Deluxe, a 2020 Nintendo Switch port of the Wii U game
Hey! Pikmin, the spin-off video game, released in 2017 for the Nintendo 3DS
Pikmin 4, the fourth video game, currently in development
Bacopa Cabana, known in English as the Pikmin flower
The Pikmin family of organisms, which star in a self-titled game series (shown above)